Jay C. Hartzell is an American economist and the 30th President of The University of Texas at Austin. Additionally, he holds the Centennial Chair in Business Education Leadership and the Trammell Crow Regents Professor in Business at UT Austin.

Education and career 

Hartzell was born in Kansas and grew up in Oklahoma. He graduated from Trinity University in San Antonio cum laude with a B.S. in business administration and economics. After receiving a doctorate in finance from UT Austin, he served as an assistant professor of finance at New York University's Stern School of Business.

The University of Texas at Austin 

In 2001, Hartzell returned to UT Austin as a faculty member in the McCombs School of Business. Since then, he has served in various capacities, including as the senior associate dean for academic affairs, the executive director of the business school's Real Estate Finance and Investment Center, and as the chair of UT Austin's finance department. In 2016, he was named dean of the McCombs School of Business. As dean, Hartzell launched the Goff Real Estate Labs, elevated the Canfield Business Honors program and opened Rowling Hall, the home of UT Austin's MBA program. He helped create many significant partnerships with colleges and schools across campus including the Dell Medical School, the College of Fine Arts, the College of Liberal Arts, the College of Natural Sciences and the Moody College of Communication. He established the position of Associate Dean of Diversity and Inclusion at the McCombs School and the McCombs Diversity and Inclusion Committee. He also established McCombs’ one-year Master of Science in Finance degree, created the Undergraduate Real Estate Certificate Program and oversaw the completion of the fundraising, construction and opening of Rowling Hall, a 500,000-square-foot graduate business facility.

In April 2020, the University of Texas System's Board of Regents appointed Hartzell to serve as interim president of UT Austin.

In July 2020, in response to concerns raised by student athletes, alumni and other UT Austin community members, Hartzell announced a series of measures designed to create a more diverse and welcoming campus at UT Austin.  The measures included: working with a group of students, faculty members, staffers and alumni to allocate a multimillion-dollar investment from Athletics’ revenue to UT Austin programs to recruit, attract, retain and support Black students; renaming the Robert L. Moore Building as the Physics, Math and Astronomy Building; honoring Heman M. Sweatt, UT Austin's first Black student, in a variety of ways on campus; commissioning a new monument for the Precursors, the first Black undergraduates to attend UT Austin; erecting a statue for Julius Whittier, UT Austin's first Black football player; and renaming Joe Jamail Field for Heisman Trophy winners Earl Campbell and Ricky Williams. He has at the same time also received criticism from Black lawmakers and UT students concerning his defence of the song "Eyes of Texas" although considered a racist tradition of the university by many 

Throughout the summer of 2020, Hartzell led UT Austin's response to the COVID-19 crisis, and on August 13, 2020, the UT System Board of Regents announced Hartzell as the sole finalist for the position of UT Austin president.

On September 23, 2020, the UT System Board of Regents unanimously voted to name Hartzell the 30th president of UT Austin, effective immediately.

References

Living people
University of Texas at Austin faculty
Trinity University (Texas) alumni
University of Texas at Austin alumni
American economists
Business school deans
New York University Stern School of Business faculty
American university and college faculty deans
1973 births